A portable computer is a computer designed to be easily moved from one place to another, as opposed to those designed to remain stationary at a single location such as desktops and workstations.  These computers usually include a display and keyboard that are directly connected to the main case, all sharing a single power plug together, much like later desktop computers called all-in-ones (AIO) that integrate the system's internal components into the same case as the display.  In modern usage, a portable computer usually refers to a very light and compact personal computer such as a laptop, miniature or pocket-sized computer, while touchscreen-based handheld ("palmtop") devices such as tablet, phablet and smartphone are called mobile devices instead.

The first commercially sold portable computer might be the  MCM/70, released 1974. The next major portables were the  IBM 5100 (1975), Osborne's  CP/M-based Osborne 1 (1981) and Compaq's , advertised as 100% IBM PC compatible Compaq Portable (1983).  These luggable computers still required a continuous connection to an external power source; this limitation was later overcome by the laptop computers. Laptops were followed by lighter models such as netbooks, so that in the 2000s mobile devices and by 2007 smartphones made the term "portable" rather meaningless. The 2010s introduced wearable computers such as smartwatches.

Portable computers, by their nature, are generally microcomputers.  Larger portable computers were commonly known as 'Lunchbox' or 'Luggable' computers. They are also called 'Portable Workstations' or 'Portable PCs'. In Japan they were often called  from "bento".

Portable computers, more narrowly defined, are distinct from desktop replacement computers in that they usually were constructed from full-specification desktop components, and often do not incorporate features associated with laptops or mobile devices. A portable computer in this usage, versus a laptop or other mobile computing device, have a standard motherboard or backplane providing plug-in slots for add-in cards. This allows mission specific cards such as test, A/D, or communication protocol (IEEE-488, 1553) to be installed. Portable computers also provide for more disk storage by using standard disk drives and provide for multiple drives.

Early history

SCAMP
In 1973, the IBM Los Gatos Scientific Center developed a portable computer prototype called SCAMP (Special Computer APL Machine Portable) based on the IBM PALM processor with a Philips compact cassette drive, small CRT and full function keyboard. SCAMP emulated an IBM 1130 minicomputer in order to run APL\1130. In 1973, APL was generally available only on mainframe computers, and most desktop sized microcomputers such as the Wang 2200 or HP 9800 offered only BASIC. Because SCAMP was the first to emulate APL\1130 performance on a portable, single user computer, PC Magazine in 1983 designated SCAMP a "revolutionary concept" and "the world's first personal computer". The engineering prototype is in the Smithsonian Institution.

Xerox NoteTaker
Xerox NoteTaker, developed in 1976 at Xerox PARC, was a precursor to later portable computers from Osborne Computer Corporation and Compaq, though it remained a prototype and did not enter production.

IBM 5100
Successful demonstrations of the 1973 SCAMP prototype led to the first commercial IBM 5100 portable microcomputer launched in 1975. The product incorporated an IBM PALM processor,  CRT, full function keyboard and the ability to be programmed in both APL and BASIC for engineers, analysts, statisticians and other business problem-solvers. (IBM provided different models of the 5100 supporting only BASIC, only APL, or both selectable by a physical switch on the front panel.) IBM referred to its PALM processor as a microprocessor, though they used that term to mean a processor that executes microcode to implement a higher-level instruction set, rather than its conventional definition of a complete processor on a single silicon integrated circuit; the PALM processor was a large circuit board populated with over a dozen chips. In the late 1960s, such a machine would have been nearly as large as two desks and would have weighed about half a ton. In comparison, the IBM 5100 weighed about 53 pounds (24 kg and very portable for that time).

MIT Suitcase Computer
The MIT Suitcase Computer, constructed in 1975, was the first known microprocessor-based portable computer. It was based on the Motorola 6800. Built by student David Emberson in the MIT Digital Systems Laboratory as a thesis project, it never entered production. It is currently in the collection of Dr. Hoo-Min D. Toong.

Micro Star or Small One
An early portable computer was manufactured in 1979 by GM Research, a small company in Santa Monica, California. The machine which was designed and patented by James Murez. It was called the Micro Star and later the name was changed to The Small One. Although Xerox claims to have designed the first such system, the machine by Murez predated anything on the market or that had been documented in any publication at the time hence the patent was issued. As early as 1979, the U.S. Government was contracting to purchase these machines. Other major customers included Sandia Labs, General Dynamics, BBN (featured on the cover of their annual report in 1980 as the C.A.T. system) and several dozen private individuals and companies around the world. In 1979, Adam Osborne viewed the machine along with several hundred other visitors at the first computer show that was sponsored by the IEEE Westec in Los Angeles.  Later that year the machine was also shown at the first COMDEX show.

Portal R2E CCMC

The portable micro computer; the "Portal" of the French company R2E Micral CCMC officially appeared in September 1980 at the Sicob show in Paris. The Portal was a portable microcomputer designed and marketed by the studies and developments department of the French firm R2E Micral in 1980 at the request of the company CCMC specializing in payroll and accounting. The Portal was based on an intel 8085 processor, 8-bit, clocked at 2 MHz. It was equipped with a central 64 KB RAM, a keyboard with 58 alpha numeric keys and 11 numeric keys (separate blocks), a 32-character screen, a floppy disk: capacity = 140 000 characters, of a thermal printer: speed = 28 characters / sec, an asynchronous channel, a synchronous channel, a 220 V power supply. It provided total mobility. Its operating system was Prolog. A few hundred were sold between 1980 and 1983.

Osborne 1
The first mass-produced microprocessor-based portable computer released in 1981 was the Osborne 1, developed by Osborne, which owed much to the NoteTaker's design. The company had early success with the design and went public but later due to small screen sizes and other devices being released found trouble selling the Osborne. The Osborne 1 is about the size and weight of a sewing machine, and was advertised as the only computer that would fit underneath an airline seat.

Kaypro
Another early portable computer released in 1982 was named the Kaypro II, although it was the company's first commercially available product. Some of the press mocked its design—one magazine described Kaypro Corporation as "producing computers packaged in tin cans". It managed to correct most of the Osborne 1's deficiencies: the screen was larger and showed more characters at once, the floppy drives stored over twice as much data, the case was more attractive-looking, and it was also much better-built and more reliable.

Grid Compass
The Grid Compass ran its own operating system, GRiD-OS. Its specialized software and high price (US$8,000–10,000) meant that it was limited to specialized applications. The main buyer was the U.S. government. NASA used it on the Space Shuttle during the early 1980s, as it was powerful, lightweight, and compact. The military Special Forces also purchased the machine, as it could be used by paratroopers in combat.

Post-IBM PC portables

Compaq Portable and competitors
Although Columbia Data Product's MPC 1600, "Multi Personal Computer" came out in June 1983, one of the first extensively IBM PC compatible computers was the Compaq Portable. Eagle Computer then came out with their offering. and Corona Data Systems's PPC-400., the "portable" Hyperion Computer System. Both Eagle Computer and Columbia were sued by IBM for copyright infringement of its BIOS. They settled and were forced to halt production. Neither the Columbia nor the Eagle were nearly as IBM PC DOS compatible as Compaq's offerings.

Commodore SX-64
The first full-color portable computer was the Commodore SX-64 in January 1984..

Atari STacy 
Originally announced in 1987, the Atari STacy was released to the public in December 1989 and was one of the first laptop-like portables.

Apple Macintosh
Apple Inc. introduced and released the Macintosh Portable in 1989, though this device came with a battery, which added to its substantial weight.  The Portable has features similar to the Atari STacy, include integrated trackball and clamshell case.

IBM PS/2 Portable 
After release of IBM PC Convertible in 1986, IBM still produced classic portable computers, include released in 1989 PS/2 P70 (with upgrade in 1990 to P75), and IBM produce portables for up to release of PS/2 Note and PS/55note notebook lines.

Modern portables
In today's world of laptops, smart phones, and tablets, portable computers have evolved and are now mostly used for industrial, commercial or military applications.

Timeline

See also
 Bobst Graphic Scrib Portable
 DYSEAC, 1954, housed in a truck
 Handheld PC (palmtop)
 Laptop
 Mobile computing
 Mobile device
 Netbook
 Personal computer
 Personal digital assistant (PDA)
 Portal laptop computer

References

External links 
 

 
Classes of computers